Kullangarai is a village in the Thanjavur taluk of Thanjavur district, Tamil Nadu, India.

Demographics 

As per the 2001 census, Kullangarai had a total population of 2061 with 1096 males and  1165 females. The sex ratio was 1063. The literacy rate was 59.98.

References 

 

Villages in Thanjavur district